{{safesubst:#invoke:RfD|||month = March
|day = 20
|year = 2023
|time = 13:01
|timestamp = 20230320130129

|content=
REDIRECT List of generation II Pokémon

}}